Bernard Lyddon Hookins (1883–1946), was a male English international table tennis player.

Table tennis career
He was selected to represent England during the 1930 World Table Tennis Championships in the Swaythling Cup (men's team event). He was also selected as England captain for two international fixtures.

The team consisting of H.C. Cooke, Vincent Blatchford, Stanley Proffitt and Tommy Sears finished in sixth place. He was one of the four founders of the Yorkshire County Table Tennis Association in 1924 and represented Pontefract at club level.

See also
 List of England players at the World Team Table Tennis Championships
 List of World Table Tennis Championships medalists

References

English male table tennis players
1883 births
1946 deaths